In taxonomy, the Hyphomonadaceae are a family of the Caulobacterales.

References

Further reading

Scientific databases

External links

Caulobacterales
Bacteria families